Napoleon Is to Blame for Everything is a 1938 German comedy film directed by Curt Goetz and starring Goetz, Valerie von Martens and Paul Henckels. It marked the German debut of the Norwegian-born star Kirsten Heiberg.

The film's sets were designed by the art director Emil Hasler.

When Goetz and his wife subsequently emigrated from Nazi Germany, the film was banned by Joseph Goebbels.

Synopsis
Lord Cavershott is a fanatical admirer of Napoleon to the extent that he neglects his own wife Josephine. While attending a conference in Paris to commemorate the French Emperor he becomes mixed up with an attractive young singer, leading to complications and much confusion.

Cast
 Curt Goetz as Lord Arthur Cavershott
 Valerie von Martens as Lady Josephine Cavershott
 Paul Henckels as Lord Cunningham
 Else von Möllendorff as Pünktchen (Madeleine)
 Kirsten Heiberg as Fifi
 Max Gülstorff as Professor Meunier
 Willi Schur as Rustan
 Maria Krahn as Madge, Kammerzofe
 Leopold von Ledebur as Butler William
 Hans Mierendorff as Revue-Dichter
 Rudolf Schündler as Rundfunkreporter
 Eduard von Winterstein as Mister Harrison
 Jack Trevor as Minister
 Olga Limburg as Madame Prunelle
 Hermann Pfeiffer as Revue-Napoleon
 Horst Birr as Junger reporter in paris
 Eberhard Leithoff as Regisseur Cukier
 Edmond Leslie as Tänzer
 Christel Schmitz as Tänzerin
 Walter Gross as Reiseführer im Autobus
 Charly Berger as Assistant Kriminalbeamter
 Egon Brosig as Teilnehmer am Napoleon Kongress
 Peter Busse as Mitglied des Empfangskomitee
 Angelo Ferrari as Mitglied des Empfangskomitee
 Lothar Glathe as Diener
 Fred Goebel as Kriminalbeamter
 Willy Kaiser-Heyl as Teilnehmer am Napoleon Kongress
 Alfred Karen as Mitglied des Empfangskomitee
 Seraj Munir as Teilnehmer am Napoleon Kongress
 Karl Platen as Angestellter im Pariser Theater
 Werner Schott as Teilnehmer am Napoleon Kongress
 Leo Sloma as Wirt
 Otto Stoeckel as Teilnehmer am Napoleon Kongress
 Eugen von Bongardt as Teilnehmer am Napoleon Kongress

References

Bibliography

External links 
 

1938 films
1938 comedy films
German comedy films
Films of Nazi Germany
1930s German-language films
Films directed by Curt Goetz
Tobis Film films
Films set in Paris
German black-and-white films
1930s German films